The girls' doubles tournament of the 2017 Asian Junior Badminton Championships was held from July 26 to 30. The defending champions of the last edition were Du Yue and Xu Ya from China. The No. 3 seed from South Korea Baek Ha-na and Lee Yu-rim claim the title after defeat the Chinese pair Liu Xuanxuan and Xia Yuting in straight games with the score 21–12, 21–19.

Seeds

 Kim Min-ji / Seong Ah-yeong (third round)
 Agatha Imanuela / Siti Fadia Silva Ramadhanti (semifinals)
 Baek Ha-na / Lee Yu-rim (champion)
 Jauza Fadhila Sugiarto / Ribka Sugiarto (semifinals)
 Pearly Tan Koong Le / Toh Ee Wei (quarterfinals)
 Supisara Paewsampran / Kwanchanok Sudjaipraparat (third round)
 Serena Kani / Pitha Haningtyas Mentari (quarterfinals)
 Ng Wan Win / Yap Ling (third round)

Draw

Finals

Top half

Section 1

Section 2

Section 3

Section 4

Bottom half

Section 5

Section 6

Section 7

Section 8

References

External links 
Main Draw

2017 Badminton Asia Junior Championships
Junior